Shape Arts or Shape is a British arts charity, working across the UK and internationally. funded by Arts Council England, that provides opportunities for disabled individuals wanting to work in the arts and cultural sector. It trains participants and runs arts and development programmes across all of the creative arts: visual arts, music, dance, writing and acting.

History
Shape was founded by Gina Levete MBE in 1976 with project funding from the Gulbenkian Foundation. Tony Heaton OBE was CEO from 2008-2017, the current CEO is David Hevey

Shape was informed by the political activism of the 1960s. Disability arts grew out of the disability rights movement, and the wider struggle by disabled people for equality and the right to participate in all aspects of society.

Activities
The Shape Open: an annual exhibition of artwork by disabled and non-disabled artists created in response to a disability-centred theme. Usually held in a high-profile, artist-led spaces.
Unlimited: an arts commissioning programme offering talented disabled artists funds and mentoring support to develop, produce and show ambitious work. Delivered in partnership with Artsadmin.
NDACA the 'National Disability Arts Collection and Archive':  a £1-million digital archive chronicling the history of disability arts in the UK.
Adam Reynolds Memorial Bursary: flagship art award, designed to support a mid-career disabled artist or artists, looking to develop their practice and build their profile by offering funds and a three month residency at a high-profile arts venue. 
Shape Collection: an expanding collection currently holding over 20 works on long term or permanent loan, it includes sculptural pieces by the late Adam Reynolds, and the Incarnate photographic series by Tom Shakespeare. Other artists include Jason Wilsher-Mills, Caroline Cardus, James Lake and Tony Heaton OBE. 

Shape Arts arranges exhibitions, awards bursaries to promising disabled artists and provides training in media and marketing skills. From December 2012 - Spring 2013, a pop-up exhibition entitled 'Shape in the City' was presented in the centre of the City of London. Shape had a temporary exhibition space for two years at Westfield Stratford City from 2012 - 2014.

Notable artists
Yinka Shonibare CBE, who is now Patron of their annual Shape Open, is a disabled artist who worked as an arts development officer at Shape in the 90s. Shonibare acknowledges the role that Shape Arts played in his early career: "I worked for Shape three days a week, running workshops on singing, dancing or visual arts for disabled and older people in day centres and hospitals. The job meant I could afford to rent a studio and it gave me organisational and fundraising skills." In 2013, Shonibare was announced as patron of the annual Shape 'Open' exhibition where disabled and non-disabled artists are invited to submit work in response to a disability focused theme.
Guy Evans, a founding member of Echo City, is a progressive rock drummer with Subterraneans who worked at Shape Arts in an administrative role and as a workshop leader.
Kelly Knox, one of Britain's leading disabled fashion models, worked at Shape Arts for a number of years as a programme co-ordinator.

Financial Support
Renowned British contemporary artists have donated artworks to Shape to raise money for the charity through an auction at Bonhams. Funds raised from the sale were matched by the Arts Council’s Catalyst Arts Fund and went towards supporting new arts activities and opportunities for disabled people. Works by Jake and Dinos Chapman, Mat Collishaw, Angela de la Cruz, Tacita Dean, Sir Antony Gormley, Marc Quinn and David Shrigley were auctioned at Bonhams London on 4 March 2014.

In 2016, an online auction at Paddle8 included donations of twenty-five artworks from a range of internationally acclaimed artists including Jeremy Deller, Julie Umerle, Candida Hofer, Ragnar Kjartansson, Hito Steyerl, Grayson Perry and Hans Op de Beeck in support of Shape Arts' 40th anniversary and the continued importance of the organisation's work.

Adam Reynolds' Memorial Bursary 

The Adam Reynolds Award, formerly the Adam Reyonolds Memorial Bursary, was inaugurated in 2008 in memory of the sculptor Adam Reynolds(1959-2005). It is one of the most significant opportunities for disabled visual artists in the UK, offering an opportunity to engage in a three-month residency at a high-profile gallery. Venues that have hosted the residencies include the V & A, Camden Arts Centre, Spike Island, The BALTIC, the Bluecoat Gallery and New Art Gallery Walsall.

References

External links 
Shape Arts website

Charities for disabled people based in the United Kingdom
Disability in the arts
Arts organisations based in the United Kingdom
1976 establishments in the United Kingdom
Charities based in London